Apalonia is a genus of rove beetles in the family Staphylinidae. There are at least 40 described species in Apalonia.

Species
These 43 species belong to the genus Apalonia:

 Apalonia alboterminalis Pace, 2015 g
 Apalonia antestricta Pace, 2015 g
 Apalonia approuagensis Pace, 2015 g
 Apalonia athetoides Pace, 2015 g
 Apalonia bulbufuscata Pace, 2015 g
 Apalonia cayennensis Pace, 2015 g
 Apalonia cayennicola Pace, 2015 g
 Apalonia complicata Pace, 2015 g
 Apalonia comtensis Pace, 2015 g
 Apalonia confundibilis Pace, 2015 g
 Apalonia courciboensis Pace, 2015 g
 Apalonia curvata Pace, 2015 g
 Apalonia dimidiaticornis Pace, 2015 g
 Apalonia falx Pace, 2015 g
 Apalonia gnypetoides Pace, 2015 g
 Apalonia guyanensis Pace, 2015 g
 Apalonia guycurticornis Pace, 2015 g
 Apalonia guyfemoralis Pace, 2015 g
 Apalonia guyimpressicollis Pace, 2015 g
 Apalonia guymaculiventris Pace, 2015 g
 Apalonia guyplatyceps Pace, 2015 g
 Apalonia guyrorida Pace, 2015 g
 Apalonia guysimilis Pace, 2015 g
 Apalonia manaensis Pace, 2015 g
 Apalonia microdotoides Pace, 2015 g
 Apalonia mima Pace, 2015 g
 Apalonia mimopaca Pace, 2015 g
 Apalonia nana Pace, 2015 g
 Apalonia opaca Pace, 2015 g
 Apalonia ovapockensis Pace, 2015 g
 Apalonia perconfundibilis Pace, 2015 g
 Apalonia perdentata Pace, 2015 g
 Apalonia saramakensis Pace, 2015 g
 Apalonia satanoides Pace, 2015 g
 Apalonia semiopaca Pace, 2015 g
 Apalonia semiopacoides Pace, 2015 g
 Apalonia semiscapa (Pace, 1987) g
 Apalonia seticornis Casey, 1906 i c g b
 Apalonia singularitheca Pace, 2015 g
 Apalonia struyvei Pace, 2015 g
 Apalonia subcayennensis Pace, 2015 g
 Apalonia tuberculitheca Pace, 2015 g
 Apalonia uniformis Pace, 2015 g

Data sources: i = ITIS, c = Catalogue of Life, g = GBIF, b = Bugguide.net

References

Further reading

 
 
 
 
 
 
 
 
 
 
 
 
 

Aleocharinae